In quantum field theory, the Dirac adjoint defines the dual operation of a Dirac spinor.  The Dirac adjoint is motivated by the need to form well-behaved, measurable quantities out of Dirac spinors, replacing the usual role of the Hermitian adjoint.

Possibly to avoid confusion with the usual Hermitian adjoint, some textbooks do not provide a name for the Dirac adjoint but simply call it "ψ-bar".

Definition 

Let  be a Dirac spinor.  Then its Dirac adjoint is defined as

Spinors under Lorentz transformations 

The Lorentz group of special relativity is not compact, therefore spinor representations of Lorentz transformations are generally not unitary.  That is, if  is a projective representation of some Lorentz transformation,

,

then, in general,

.

The Hermitian adjoint of a spinor transforms according to

.

Dirac adjoints, in contrast, transform according to

.

Using the identity , the transformation reduces to

,

Usage 

Using the Dirac adjoint, the probability four-current J for a spin-1/2 particle field can be written as

where c is the speed of light and the components of J represent the probability density ρ and the probability 3-current j:

.

Taking  and using the relation for gamma matrices

,

the probability density becomes

.

See also 

Dirac equation
Rarita–Schwinger equation

References 

B. Bransden and C. Joachain (2000). Quantum Mechanics, 2e, Pearson. .
M. Peskin and D. Schroeder (1995). An Introduction to Quantum Field Theory, Westview Press. .
A. Zee (2003). Quantum Field Theory in a Nutshell, Princeton University Press. .

Quantum field theory
Spinors
Mathematical notation
Paul Dirac